Dogali is a town in eastern Eritrea. Situated near Massawa, it became famous for the Battle of Dogali, on January 24, 1887, between Italy and the Ethiopian Empire, specifically the lord Ras Alula.

Transport
The town is served by a station on the national railway network, built by the Italians.

See also
 Railway stations in Eritrea

References

External links

Populated places in Eritrea